The fifth season of the American television series Legends of Tomorrow, which is based on characters from DC Comics, premiered on The CW on January 21, 2020. The season consisted of 15 episodes, which includes the special episode for the "Crisis on Infinite Earths" crossover that precedes the season premiere. It is set in the Arrowverse, sharing continuity with the other television series of the universe, and is a spin-off of Arrow and The Flash. The season was produced by Berlanti Productions, Warner Bros. Television, and DC Entertainment, with Phil Klemmer and Keto Shimizu serving as showrunners.

The season was ordered in January 2019. Production began that July, and wrapped in January 2020. Principal cast members Brandon Routh, Caity Lotz, Maisie Richardson-Sellers, Tala Ashe, Jes Macallan, Courtney Ford, Amy Louise Pemberton, Nick Zano, Dominic Purcell and Matt Ryan return from previous seasons, while Olivia Swann was promoted to the main cast from her guest status in season four.

Episodes

Cast and characters

Main
Brandon Routh as Ray Palmer / Atom
Caity Lotz as Sara Lance / White Canary
Maisie Richardson-Sellers as Charlie / Clotho
Tala Ashe as Zari Tarazi and Zari Tomaz
Jes Macallan as Ava Sharpe
Courtney Ford as Nora Darhk
Olivia Swann as Astra Logue
Amy Louise Pemberton as Gideon
Nick Zano as Nate Heywood / Steel
Dominic Purcell as Mick Rory / Heat Wave
Matt Ryan as John Constantine
LaMonica Garrett as Mobius / Anti-Monitor

Recurring
Ramona Young as Mona Wu
Adam Tsekhman as Gary Green
Shayan Sobhian as Behrad Tarazi
Lisa Marie DiGiacinto as Ali
Sarah Strange as Lachesis
Mina Sundwall as Lita
Emmerson Sadler as Lita (ages 5 and 7)
Scarlett Jando as Lita (ages 8, 9 & 10)
Joanna Vanderham as Atropos

Guest

"Crisis on Infinite Earths"

Production

Development
On January 31, 2019, The CW renewed the series for a fifth season. Phil Klemmer and Keto Shimizu serve as the season's showrunners.

Writing
The fourth season ended with Astra Logue restoring many notorious historical figures like Genghis Khan, Joseph Stalin and Charles Manson to life. Klemmer said these characters would be called "Encores" and have the villain of the week treatment, while the Big Bad of the season would not be demon-related, later revealed to be Lachesis and Atropos of the three Fates. He explained this was done with the intention of returning to the series' roots, of being rooted "more firmly in history and historical periods and figures and true villains". Klemmer added that the season would explore what Zari Tomaz would look like if she "lived a more charmed life" and did not come from a "dystopian, authoritarian future". The season also explores Zari's relationship with her brother Behrad Tarazi. Following the season four finale, the Time Bureau was shut down and its former director Ava Sharpe was left unemployed. The fifth season sees Ava living on the Waverider with her girlfriend Sara Lance, trying to figure out how she fits on the team. It continues to grow the "Avalance" relationship, and also features Sara developing the power of precognition.

Casting
Main cast members Brandon Routh, Caity Lotz, Maisie Richardson-Sellers, Tala Ashe, Jes Macallan, Amy Louise Pemberton, Courtney Ford, Nick Zano, Dominic Purcell and Matt Ryan return as Ray Palmer, Sara Lance, Charlie, Zari Tomaz, Ava Sharpe, Gideon, Nora Darhk, Nate Heywood, Mick Rory, and John Constantine respectively. This is the final season for Routh, Ford and Richardson-Sellers, with the episode "Romeo v Juliet: Dawn of Justness" marking Routh and Ford's final appearance as series regulars, while Richardson-Sellers departed after the season finale. Olivia Swann, who guest starred as Astra Logue in the fourth season, was promoted to the main cast for the fifth season. Ramona Young, who starred as Mona Wu in the fourth season, returned as a recurring guest star. Tala Ashe, who portrayed Zari Tomaz in seasons three and four, returned this season as Zari Tarazi, a new version of the character from an altered timeline while Zari Tomaz returned in a recurring capacity.

Filming
Filming began on July 15, 2019. The fifth episode of the season, "Mortal Khanbat", marks Lotz's directorial debut. Filming wrapped in January 2020. Although the "Crisis on Infinite Earths" episode was the eighth episode filmed, the events of the episode occur before the rest of the season.

Arrowverse tie-ins
In December 2018, during the end of the annual Arrowverse crossover "Elseworlds", a follow-up crossover was announced titled "Crisis on Infinite Earths" based on the comic book series of the same name. The crossover features Tyler Hoechlin reprising his role as Clark Kent / Superman from Supergirl, while Routh portrays another version of Superman. It took place over five episodes–three in December 2019 and two in January 2020, with Legends of Tomorrows episode concluding the crossover. The Legends of Tomorrow episode is considered a special episode, and not the series' fifth season premiere.

Release

Broadcast
The season premiered on The CW on January 21, 2020. The season ran for 15 episodes, which included the special episode produced for the "Crisis on Infinite Earths" crossover before the season premiere.

Marketing
The first official trailer for the season was released on December 5, 2019.

Reception

Ratings

Notes

References

Legends of Tomorrow seasons
2020 American television seasons
Television series set in 2020